Argentina  is a genus of fishes in the family Argentinidae.

Species
There are currently 13 recognized species in this genus:
 Argentina aliceae Cohen & Atsaides, 1969 (Alice Argentina)
 Argentina australiae Cohen, 1958
 Argentina brasiliensis Kobyliansky, 2004
 Argentina brucei Cohen & Atsaides, 1969 (Bruce's Argentine)
 Argentina elongata F. W. Hutton, 1879
 Argentina euchus Cohen, 1961
 Argentina georgei Cohen & Atsaides, 1969
 Argentina kagoshimae D. S. Jordan & Snyder, 1902
 Argentina lei
 Argentina sialis C. H. Gilbert, 1890 (North-Pacific Argentine)
 Argentina silus (Ascanius, 1775) (Greater Argentine)
 Argentina sphyraena Linnaeus, 1758 (Argentine)
 Argentina stewarti Cohen & Atsaides, 1969
 Argentina striata Goode & T. H. Bean, 1896 (Striated Argentine)

References

Argentinidae
Taxa named by Carl Linnaeus
Marine fish genera